The Conservative Party of Newfoundland was a political party in the Dominion of Newfoundland prior to confederation with Canada in 1949.

The party was formed by members and supporters of the establishment around 1832. In the 1840s they opposed the proposal for responsible government which was finally granted in 1855. Since the concept was opposed generally by members of the Anglican establishment, the early party was almost entirely Protestant. As politics in Newfoundland developed along sectarian lines, the Conservatives became the Protestant party (with strong links to the Orange Order), while the Liberals were the Catholic party.

Under Sir Frederick Carter the Conservatives supported joining Canadian confederation, and campaigned on the proposal in the 1869 general election. The party was badly defeated by Charles Fox Bennett's Anti-Confederation Party. The Conservatives returned to power in 1874, but never proposed joining Canada again.

The Conservative party later absorbed the rival Liberals, putting an end to sectarian divisions with a 'denominational compromise'.

The united party collapsed in the 1880s when members of the Orange Order abandoned the government of William Whiteway, and formed a new Reform Party under Robert Thorburn. The Reform Party won the 1885 election on a platform of 'Protestant Rights'.

Whiteway founded a new Liberal Party after the collapse of the Reform Party. Members of the Orange Order formed a new Tory Party, which formed two short-lived administrations in the 1890s before disappearing.

Individual Conservatives were elected as Opposition or United Opposition MHAs before being subsumed into the Newfoundland People's Party (later the Liberal-Labour-Progressive Party) formed by Edward Patrick Morris in 1907 after he resigned from the Liberal government of Sir Robert Bond.

In 1924, the Liberal-Conservative-Progressive Party was formed by members of the LLP Party who were largely conservatives and discontented members of the ruling Liberal Reform Party. This new party won the 1924 general election, making its leader Walter Stanley Monroe the new Prime Minister. In practice, the party was essentially a Tory party.

The party was defeated in 1928 under new leader Frederick C. Alderdice, but returned to power in 1932 as the United Newfoundland Party (UNP). The UNP ruled for two years until the suspension of responsible government.

When responsible government was suspended, Newfoundland's status as an independent dominion within the British Empire was brought to an end. The Government of the United Kingdom appointed a Commission of Government to govern Newfoundland, bringing an end to party politics on the island.

Party politics returned to Newfoundland when it joined Canadian confederation in 1949. At this time, the modern Liberal and Progressive Conservative parties were formed. These new parties were unrelated to the parties that existed prior to 1934.

Leaders
 Frederick Carter 1865-1878
 William Whiteway 1878-1885
 Robert Thorburn 1885-1889 - as leader of the Reform Party 
 Augustus F. Goodridge 1889-1893 - as leader of the Tory Party
 James Spearman Winter 1893-1900
 Walter Stanley Monroe 1924-1928 - as leader of the Liberal-Conservative Progressive Party
 Frederick C. Alderdice 1928 - as leader of the Liberal-Conservative Progressive Party and United Newfoundland Party 1928-1934

See also
 List of Newfoundland Prime Ministers
 List of political parties in Newfoundland and Labrador
 General elections in Newfoundland (pre-Confederation)

Political parties in the Dominion of Newfoundland
Progressive Conservative Party of Newfoundland and Labrador